This is a list of people who have served as Custos Rotulorum of Somerset.

 Sir William Portman bef. 1554–1557
 Sir Hugh Paulet bef. 1558–1573
 Sir Amias Paulet bef. 1577–1588
 Sir John Popham bef. 1594–1607
 Sir Edward Phelips 1608–1614
 James Ley, 1st Baron Ley bef. 1621–1625
 Henry Ley, 2nd Earl of Marlborough 1625–1636
 John Coventry 1636–1646
 Interregnum
 William Seymour, 2nd Duke of Somerset 1660
 Charles Berkeley, 2nd Viscount Fitzhardinge 1660–1668
 Henry Somerset, 3rd Marquess of Worcester 1668–1672
 John Seymour, 4th Duke of Somerset 1672–1675
 Maurice Berkeley, 3rd Viscount Fitzhardinge 1675–1688
 Henry Waldegrave, 1st Baron Waldegrave 1688
 Maurice Berkeley, 3rd Viscount Fitzhardinge 1688–1690
 John Berkeley, 4th Viscount Fitzhardinge 1690–1712
 John Poulett, 1st Earl Poulett 1713–1714
 Charles Boyle, 4th Earl of Orrery 1714–1721
For later custodes rotulorum, see Lord Lieutenant of Somerset.

References
Institute of Historical Research (pre-1646)
Institute of Historical Research (post 1660)

Somerset
History of Somerset